MAL2 may refer to:
MAL2 (gene)
Region code for Western Mallee, subregion of Western Australia
Mal-2 or Malaclypse the Younger (1941-2000), Discordian writer
Mal/2, 1957 album by Mal Waldron